The Gospić concentration camp was one of 26 concentration camps in the Independent State of Croatia during World War II, established in Gospić (modern-day Croatia).

Establishment 
It belonged to the complex Gospić group of concentration camps which besides Gospić camp also included Jadovno, Ovčara, Pag (Slana and Metajna). The establishment of this complex of concentration camps marked the beginning of the final phase of the Holocaust in the Independent State of Croatia, mass murders.

The Gospić concentration camp was established in May 1941 in the building which was used as a prison before World War II and organized by Jozo Rukavina. The first transport of inmates from Danica concentration camp was organized on 30 June 1941. The prison in Gospić was placed in a large square building which equal sides of 130 meters. It was erected in 1878 and used as a prison for prisoners sentenced to life imprisonment.

Inmates 
Based on the orders issued by Ustaše command in Zagreb on 19 July 1941, notable Serbs were captured and sent to the Gospić concentration camp divided into small groups of 20 to 30. The Serbs, Jews and Romani people were captured all over the territory of the Independent State of Croatia and transported to Gospić concentration camp at daily rate of three hundred.

On 1 August 1941 Ustaše transported the first group of Jews from Visoko in Bosnia and Herzegovina to Gospić camp.

About 300 women and children were transported on 11 March 1944 from Gospić to Jasenovac where they were all killed.

Aftermath 
The Jasenovac concentration camp was founded as an extension of the disestablished Gospic and Jadovnik camps. The first inmates of Jasenovac camp were brought from Gospić concentration camp in period 19—21 August 1941.

References

Sources 

 
 
 
 
 
 
 
 
 
 
 

Concentration camps of the Independent State of Croatia
Jewish Croatian history
The Holocaust in Yugoslavia
History of the Serbs of Croatia